The Men's Greco-Roman 130 kg competition of the wrestling events at the 2022 Mediterranean Games in Oran, Algeria, was held from 26 June to 27 June at the EMEC Hall.

Results 
26 June

References

Greco-Roman 130 kg